The fighting game community, often abbreviated to FGC, is a collective of video gamers who play fighting games such as Marvel vs. Capcom, Mortal Kombat, Soulcalibur, Street Fighter, Guilty Gear, The King of Fighters, Blazblue, Super Smash Bros., Tekken, Dead or Alive, Samurai Shodown, and many others. The fighting game community started out small in the late 1990s and throughout the 2000s referred to as the grassroots era, but it has grown to a larger scale in the 2010s, with many tournaments being held around the world. This is predominantly due to the rise of esports and digitized viewing habits on live streaming sites such as Twitch.

History

Beginnings
The game Street Fighter II: The World Warrior was a huge success when it was released in 1991 and is regarded as one of the  most influential video games of all time. It refined and popularized the fighting game genre and introduced many now-staples of the genre, such as combos and character selection but most notably, it allowed players to directly compete by fighting against each other in the game, while earlier games primarily had players compete by comparing highscores. During the mid-1990s, a Street Fighter II tournament scene had coalesced in various cities across the United States. Highly competitive communities formed naturally in Chinatown Fair in New York City, Super Just Games in the Chicago area, and the Golfland arcade halls in Sunnyvale and Stanton, California. Players had also began finding each other and discussing strategies  on message boards via the internet. In 1996, the "Battle by the Bay" was conceived in order to quell debate over who was the best Street Fighter player in the country.

2000–2009: early years
In early 2000, a forum was created called Shoryuken.com which was named after the iconic Street Fighter attack. The site became the main go to forum for many fighting game competitors and it quickly attracted the community to create major tournaments to gather the best players from around the country. One of the most major tournaments that gathers players from around the world is called The Evolution Championship Series.  In middle of the 2000s the FGC's popularity began to fade due to lack of new fighting games, the overall sales of the genre, and some problems within the community. It was not until 2007 that a new spark arose in the community, when after nearly a decade without an entry, Capcom announced the continuation of the mainline Street Fighter series with the development of Street Fighter IV, following up Street Fighter III: Third Strike after eight years. The game was acclaimed by major game review outlets and is seen as the chief catalyst of the revival of the FGC.  By rejuvenating the popularity of fighting games, its release also created an influx of new players into the community, increasing the number of competitors and introducing legendary players such as SonicFox, Momochi, Snake Eyez, GamerBee, and others.

2010–current
After the success of Street Fighter IV, new fighting games began being developed and the FGC expanded with more tournaments. The tournaments even started being live-streamed with Twitch so many people can view the tournaments. There are also sponsor-ships from franchises like Evil Geniuses, Broken Tier, and Mad Catz, which pays players for free advertisement.

Despite the rise of other competitive video game genres, a phenomenon known as Esports, many members of the FGC have rejected the label of "Esports" on their community.

The overall size of the community remains a very small proportion of the fighting game market overall. Some of the genre's biggest selling games, such as Tekken 5, Super Smash Bros. and Mortal Kombat X, have sold in excess of 5 million copies. In contrast, the same games might only attract 1,000-2,000 entrants at a large tournament. Typically some 20-30% of players fight online.

In recent years, the FGC has been rocked by numerous sexual assault and harassment allegations involving legal proceedings, including those of some of its most prominent Smash Bros players and organizers.

At the 2022 Japan Fighting Game Publishers Roundtable, game development heads for Tekken, Guilty Gear, and Street Fighter came together for a livestreamed discussion on the future of fighting games and topics such as free to play business models.

Culture

In a 2014 article on the racial diversity of fighting game competitions, mainly the Evo tournament series, Mitch Bowman of Polygon wrote about "How the FGC's roots grew the most racially diverse community in gaming."

A highly publicized incident of sexism occurred in 2012 at a U.S. tournament, when Street Fighter x Tekken player Aris Bakhtanians made comments about a female player's bra size and other sexist remarks, leading the woman to drop out of the event. Later, during an interview with Twitch he is quoted as saying that  "sexual harassment is part of a culture, and if you remove that from the fighting game community, it's not the fighting game community." He later apologized for his comments.

Tournaments

Hundreds of online and offline tournaments are held worldwide every year, ranging anywhere in size from less than ten to over 10,000 entrants, depending on the location, entry fee, prize pot, and game or range of games available. Tournaments are typically run through grassroots community efforts, although an increasing number of tournaments are being sponsored by stakeholders like Capcom, Twitch, Red Bull, and Nintendo. 

Examples of large fighting game tournaments and tournament series include: 
 Apex
 Capcom Cup (which is led up to by the Capcom Pro Tour)
 Community Effort Orlando
 DreamHack
 Evolution Championship Series (or EVO, and EVO Japan)
 Pokémon World Championships (Pokkén Tournament)
 Tougeki – Super Battle Opera (defunct)
 VSFighting

Notes

References

Bibliography
 Harper, Todd, The Culture of Digital Fighting Games: Performance and Practice, Routledge Studies in New Media and Cyberculture, 2013

Virtual communities
Video game culture
Fighting games